Ludivine Kreutz (born 24 September 1973) is a French professional golfer. She was French Amateur Champion in 1995 and joined the Ladies European Tour in 1998. She has won three titles on the tour and finished sixth on the Order of Merit in both 2003 and 2005. She represented Europe in the 2005 Solheim Cup.

Ladies European Tour wins (3)
2003 La Perla Ladies Italian Open
2005 Tenerife Ladies Open, Ladies Central European Open

Team appearances
Amateur
European Lady Junior's Team Championship (representing France):  1994
European Ladies' Team Championship (representing France): 1995, 1997
Professional
Solheim Cup (representing Europe): 2005

References

French female golfers
Ladies European Tour golfers
Solheim Cup competitors for Europe
Mediterranean Games medalists in golf
Mediterranean Games silver medalists for France
Competitors at the 1997 Mediterranean Games
Sportspeople from Bouches-du-Rhône
Sportspeople from Yvelines
People from Rognac
People from Poissy
1973 births
Living people
20th-century French women